Robert Herridge (January 12, 1914 - August 14, 1981), was a television producer and writer who created the CBS television program Camera Three, among  more than 1,700 hours of TV programming, beginning in 1950.

Herridge also served as a writer for the Studio One television series in 1948.

He produced one of the first American network television shows specifically about jazz, the one-hour "The Sound of Jazz", a December 8, 1957 edition of the CBS television series The Seven Lively Arts. "The Sound of Jazz" was essentially a broadcast jam session including many luminaries of jazz, such as Miles Davis, Roy Eldridge, Coleman Hawkins, Ben Webster, Lester Young, Thelonious Monk, Milt Hinton, and  Billie Holiday.

Herridge produced and hosted The Robert Herridge Theater, a half-hour dramatic anthology that ran in syndication circa 1959-1960 or in 1961 (sources vary), primarily on educational television stations. One edition, "The Sound of Miles Davis", which Herridge referred to onscreen as "a story told in the language of music", consisted of an April 2, 1959, jazz concert by Davis, John Coltrane, Wynton Kelly, Paul Chambers, Jimmy Cobb, and the Gil Evans Orchestra at CBS TV's Studio 61. It aired July 21, 1960.

Herridge's professional interests extended beyond the world of Jazz as well. In the realm of classical music, he also produced the prime-time special Spring Festival of Music for CBS Television in 1960. The program was created at CBS in collaboration with the director Roger Englander. It showcased performances by several leading American musicians and orchestral ensembles including: Alfredo Antonini, John Browning, the Philadelphia Orchestra and the Symphony of the Air.<ref>[https://archive.org/details/televisionperfor00rose/page/104  Television and the Performing Arts]. Brian G. Rose. Greenwood Press, New York 1986 p. 104  "Spring Festival of Music" Alfredo Antonini, Symphony of the Air, Robert Herridge and John Browning collaborating on books.google</ref>

During the course of his career, Robert Herridge was the recipient of several professional awards including the George Foster Peabody Award and three Emmy Awards. 
  
Herridge died of a heart attack at his home in Woodstock, New York.

Footnotes

Further reading
Herridge, Robert. "Vision with Commentary". Poetry Magazine. May 1939. pp. 84–85
TV Key staff. "TV Key: "Steinbeck Story on 'Studio One'". The Milwaukee Sentinel. June 11, 1956.
United Press. "Jazz Featured Tomorrow in 'Lively Arts' TV Series". The Oxnard Press-Courier. December 7, 1957.
Crosby, John. "Robert Herridge, Man With Ideas". The Charleston News and Courier. March 3, 1959.
Dube, Bernard. "Dial Turns: Herridge Theatre Play Provokes Complaints". The Montreal Gazette. July 26, 1960.
"Herridge Produces Workshop". The Montreal Gazette. November 19, 1960.
Hughes, Alice. "A Woman's New York". The Reading Eagle. December 23, 1960
Hentoff, Nat. "Huckleberry Dracula Jazz, And Public TV: A familiar of Miles Davis and Dostoevski, Robert Herridge was a true television original; is there a place for him now?". The Village Voice''. July 31, 1978.

External links
Williams, Kam. African American Literature Book Club: "Rare Classic Footage Resurfaces of Miles Davis from the Fifties"
"The Sound of Miles Davis" at Crackle.com

American television producers
1981 deaths
1914 births
20th-century American businesspeople